Bukedea District is a district in the Eastern Region of Uganda. The town of Bukedea is the site of the district headquarters.

Location
Bukedea District is bordered by Kumi District to the west and north, Bulambuli District to the east, Sironko District and Mbale District to the south-east, and Pallisa District to the south.

Overview 
Bukedea District was created by an Act of the Ugandan parliament on 13 July 2006 and became operational on 1 July 2007. Before that, the district was part of Kumi District.

Population
In 1991, the national population census estimated the district population at 75,300. The national census in 2002 estimated the population at 122,400. The annual population growth rate in the district was calculated at 4.4 percent. In 2012, the population was estimated at 186,400.

References

External links
  Bukedea District Boss Accuses NRM of Abandoning Ideologies

 
Districts of Uganda
Eastern Region, Uganda